Josh Burns (born May 15, 1978) is an American professional mixed martial artist and current bare-knuckle boxer. Since 2017, Burns has competed in the Bare Knuckle Fighting Championship.

Mixed martial arts career

Bellator MMA
Burns faced TNA wrestler Bobby Lashley on September 5, 2014, at Bellator 123. Burns lost the fight via rear-naked choke submission in the second round.

Burns faced UFC vet Justin Wren at Bellator 141 on August 28, 2015. Burns lost the fight by unanimous decision.

Bare-knuckle boxing
Burns has competed in bare-knuckle boxing as recently as 2017.

Personal life
An Army veteran and bouncer, Burns is a father of seven children.

In 2021, Burns was convicted in a health care fraud scheme, and ordered to pay $144,000 in restitution. It was found that Burns took "kickbacks" in a scheme with Dr. Frank Patino, and was given a lesser punishment due to testifying against Patino. In a statement from Burns' attorney, Burns testified against Patino from being "misled" by Patino from his interests for greater profits.

Mixed martial arts record

|-
|Loss
|align=center| 8–10
|Josh Parisian
|TKO (punches)
|TWC Pro Series: Anderson vs. Veerella
|
|align=center|2
|align=center|1:50
|Lansing, Michigan, United States
|
|-
| Loss
|align=center| 8–9
| Justin Wren
| Decision (unanimous)
|Bellator 141
|
|align=center| 3
|align=center| 5:00
|Temecula, California, United States
|
|-
| Loss
| align=center| 8–8
| Bobby Lashley
| Submission (rear naked choke)
| Bellator 123
| 
| align=center| 2
| align=center| 3:54
| Uncasville, Connecticut, United States
| 
|-
| Loss
| align=center| 8–7
| Raphael Butler
| TKO (retirement)
| Bellator 107
| 
| align=center| 1
| align=center| 2:14
| Thackerville, Oklahoma, United States
| 
|-
| Win
| align=center| 8–6
| Matt Eckerle
| TKO (punches)
| Triple X Cagefighting: Legends 2
| 
| align=center| 1
| align=center| 0:15
| Mount Clemens, Michigan, United States
| 
|-
| Win
| align=center| 7–6
| Jack Rome
| Submission (punches)
| GC: Gladiator Challenge
| 
| align=center| 1
| align=center| 1:38
| San Diego, California, United States
|<small>Return to Heavyweight.
|-
| Loss
| align=center| 6–6
| Rich Hale
| TKO (punches)
| Bellator 69
| 
| align=center| 1
| align=center| 0:38
| Lake Charles, Louisiana, United States
|Light heavyweight debut.
|-
| Loss
| align=center| 6–5
| Thiago Santos
| Submission (rear naked choke)
| Bellator 53
| 
| align=center| 1
| align=center| 2:23
| Miami, Oklahoma, United States
| 
|-
| Loss
| align=center| 6–4
| Eric Prindle
| TKO (doctor stoppage)
| Bellator 40
| 
| align=center| 2
| align=center| 5:00
| Newkirk, Oklahoma, United States
| 
|-
| Win
| align=center| 6–3
| Jeffrey Kugel
| TKO (punches)
| IFL: The Saint Valentine's Day Massacre
| 
| align=center| 1
| align=center| 2:52
| Auburn Hills, Michigan, United States
| 
|-
| Loss
| align=center| 5–3
| Kelly Gray
| TKO ( verbal submission )
| MMA Xplosion: Gunderson vs. Sharp
| 
| align=center| 1
| align=center| 3:09
| Las Vegas, Nevada, United States
| 
|-
| Loss
| align=center| 5–2
| Patrick Barrentine
| Submission
| MMA Big Show: Mayhem
| 
| align=center| 1
| align=center| 2:20
| Florence, Indiana, United States
| 
|-
| Loss
| align=center| 5–1
| Dave Hess
| Submission (rear naked choke)
| MMA Big Show: Retribution
| 
| align=center| 3
| align=center| N/A
| Florence, Indiana, United States
| 
|-
| Win
| align=center| 5–0
| Stephen Williams
| Decision (split)
| Poor Boy Promotions: Return to the River
| 
| align=center| 3
| align=center| 5:00
| Detroit, Michigan, United States
| 
|-
| Win
| align=center| 4–0
| Phillip Hill
| Decision (unanimous)
| Poor Boy Promotions: Motown Madness
| 
| align=center| 3
| align=center| 5:00
| Detroit, Michigan, United States
| 
|-
| Win
| align=center| 3–0
| James Kilpatrick
| Submission (north south choke)
| Poor Boy Promotions: Rumble on the River 2
| 
| align=center| 2
| align=center| 4:41
| Detroit, Michigan, United States
| 
|-
|Win
|align=center| 2–0
|Matt O'Connor
|KO (punches)
|Poor Boy Promotions: Rooster Tail Fight Night 2
|
|align=center| 1
|align=center| 3:22
|Detroit, Michigan, United States
| 
|-
| Win
| align=center| 1–0
| Gabriel Martinez
| TKO (punches)
| Poor Boy Promotions: Rumble on the River 1
| 
| align=center| 1
| align=center| 0:45
| Detroit, Michigan, United States
|

Mixed martial arts amateur record

|-
| Win
| align=center| 1–0
| Matt Goff
| Submission (triangle choke)
| KOTC: New Breed
| 
| align=center| 2
| align=center| 1:22
| Mescalero, New Mexico, United States
|

Bare-knuckle boxing record

|-
|Loss
|align=center|6–7
|D. J. Linderman 
|TKO (referee stoppage) 
|BYB 11: Brawl in Doral 
|
|align=center|3
|align=center|1:40
|Doral, Florida, United States
|
|-
|Loss
|align=center|6–6
|Tony Lopez
|Decision (unanimous)
|BYB 9: Tampa Brawl 
|
|align=center|5
|align=center|3:00
|Tampa, Florida, United States
|
|-
|Win
|align=center|6–5
|Sam Shewmaker
|KO (punch)
|BKFC 21
|
|align=center|1
|align=center|0:19
|Omaha, Nebraska, United States
|
|-
|Loss
|align=center|5–5
|Frank Tate
|TKO (corner stoppage) 
|BKFC 17
|
|align=center|3
|align=center|1:02
|Birmingham, Alabama, United States
|
|-
|Win
|align=center|5–4 
|Chris Sarro
|KO (punches)
|BKFC 15
|
|align=center|2
|align=center|0:18
|Biloxi, Mississippi, United States 
|
|-
|Loss
|align=center|4–4
|Daniel Podmore
|TKO (doctor stoppage) 
|BKB 17 
|
|align=center|3
|align=center|2:00
|Biloxi, Mississippi, United States 
|
|-
|Loss
|align=center|4–3 
|Tony Johnson 
|TKO (doctor stoppage) 
|BKB 13
|
|align=center|1
|align=center|N/A
|London, England, United Kingdom
|
|-
|Win
|align=center|4–2
|Adam Jenkins
|KO
|BKB 10
|
|align=center|1
|align=center|N/A 
|Liverpool, England, United Kingdom
|
|-
|Loss
|align=center|3–2
|Mick Terrill 
|TKO (referee stoppage) 
|BKB 9 
|
|align=center|5
|align=center|2:00
|Liverpool, England, United Kingdom
|
|-
|Win
|align=center|3–1
|Billy Hawthorn
|KO
|BKB 7
|
|align=center|2
|align=center|N/A 
|Liverpool, England, United Kingdom
|
|-
|Win
|align=center|2–1
|Neil Derry
|KO
|BKB 6
|
|align=center|2
|align=center|N/A 
|Coventry, England, United Kingdom
|
|-
|Win
|align=center|1–1
|Karl Cook 
|KO
|BKB 5 
|
|align=center|1
|align=center|N/A 
|Coventry, England, United Kingdom
|
|-
|Loss
|align=center|0–1
|Hari Miles
|Decision (unanimous)
|BKB 4 
|
|align=center|3
|align=center|2:00
|Coventry, England, United Kingdom
|
|-

See also
List of Bellator MMA alumni
List of male mixed martial artists
https://www.detroitnews.com/story/news/local/detroit-city/2018/10/11/mma-fighter-josh-burns-guilty-fraud-case-involving-dr-frank-patino/1606264002/

References

1978 births
American male mixed martial artists
Mixed martial artists from Ohio
Heavyweight mixed martial artists
American male boxers
Bare-knuckle boxers
Boxers from Ohio 
Living people